The Beardmore W.B.1 was a British single-engine bomber biplane of World War I developed by Beardmore.

Development and design
In 1916, G. Tilghman Richards, the newly appointed chief designer of the aviation department of the Scottish shipbuilder William Beardmore, designed his first aircraft for Beardmore, the W.B.1.  This was to be a single engined bomber for the Royal Naval Air Service (RNAS), which was intended to carry out long gliding attacks to achieve surprise.  It was a three-bay biplane with long span high aspect ratio wings, which were highly staggered.  It was powered by a 230 hp (172 kW) BHP engine and  first flew in early 1917.

The W.B.1 was delivered to the RNAS at Cranwell for evaluation on 8 June 1917.  By this time however, the larger and more capable Handley Page O/100 was in production and the W.B.1 was rejected by the RNAS.

Specifications

References

Sources
 
  

1910s British bomber aircraft
W.B.1
Aircraft first flown in 1917
Biplanes